Montana State University (MSU) is a public land-grant research university in Bozeman, Montana. It is the state's largest university. MSU offers baccalaureate degrees in 60 fields, master's degrees in 68 fields, and doctoral degrees in 35 fields through its nine colleges. More than 16,700 students attended MSU in fall 2019, taught by 796 full-time and 547 part-time faculty.

MSU is classified among "R1: Doctoral Universities – Very high research activity" and had research expenditures of $129.6 million in 2017.

Located on the south side of Bozeman, the university's  campus is the largest in the state. The university's main campus in Bozeman is home to KUSM television, KGLT radio, and the Museum of the Rockies. MSU provides outreach services to citizens and communities statewide through its agricultural experiment station and 60 county and reservation extension offices.

History

Establishment of the college

Montana became a state on 8 November 1889. Several cities competed intensely to be the state capital, the city of Bozeman among them. In time, the city of Helena was named the state capital. As a consolation, the state legislature agreed to put the state's land-grant college in Bozeman. Gallatin County donated half of its 160-acre poor farm for the campus, and money for an additional 40 acres, which had been planned to hold a state capital, was raised by the community, including a $1,500 donation from rancher and businessman Nelson Story, Sr. This land, as well as additional property and monetary contributions, was now turned over to the state for the new college.

MSU was founded in 1893 as the Agricultural College of the State of Montana. It opened on 16 February with five male and three female students. The first classes were held in rooms in the county high school, and later that year in the shuttered Bozeman Academy (a private preparatory school). The first students were from Bozeman Academy, and were forced to transfer to the college. Only two faculty existed on opening day: Luther Foster, a horticulturalist from South Dakota who was also Acting President, and Homer G. Phelps, who taught business. Within weeks, they were joined by S.M. Emery (who ran the agricultural experiment station) and Benjamin F. Maiden (an English teacher from the former Bozeman Academy). Augustus M. Ryon, a coal mine owner, was named the first president of the college on 17 April 1893. Ryon immediately clashed with the board of trustees and faculty. Where the trustees wanted the college to focus on agriculture, Ryon pointed out that few of its students intended to go back to farming. While the rapidly expanding faculty wanted to establish a remedial education program to assist unprepared undergraduates (Montana's elementary and secondary public education system was in dire shape at the time), Ryon refused. The donation of the Story land to the college occurred in 1894, but Ryon was forced out in 1895 and replaced by the Rev. Dr. James R. Reid, a Presbyterian minister who had been president of the Montana College at Deer Lodge since 1890.

The college grew quickly under Reid, who provided 10 years of stability and harmony. The student body grew so fast that the high school building was completely taken over by the college. A vacant store on Main Street was rented to provide additional classroom space. Both the Agricultural Experiment Station (now known as Taylor Hall) and the Main Building (now known as Montana Hall) were constructed in 1896, although the agricultural building was the first to open. Both structures were occupied in 1898. The university football team was established in 1897, and the college graduated its first four students that same year. The curriculum expanded into civil and electrical engineering in 1898.

Expansion and growth under Hamilton and Atkinson

Reid resigned for health reasons in 1905, and was succeeded by Dr. James M. Hamilton, an economist. Determined to make the college into a school of technology, he rapidly expanded the curriculum areas such as biology, chemistry, engineering, geology, and physics. Hamilton also devised the university motto, "Education for Efficiency", which the college continued to use until the 1990s. Further marking this change in direction, the school was officially renamed the Montana College of Agriculture and Mechanic Arts in 1913 (although that name was in widespread use as early as 1894). The college's first great rapid expansion of physical plant also began under Hamilton. Constructed during this time were Linfield Hall (1908), Hamilton Hall (1910), and Traphagen Hall (1919). The giant whitewashed "M" on the side of the Mount Baldy in the foothills of the Bridger Range was first built in 1916, and in 1917 ROTC came to campus for the first time.

Hamilton resigned in 1919 to become Dean of Men, and his successor was agricultural expert Alfred Atkinson. Atkinson's tenure lasted 17 years (1920 to 1937). A firm believer in Hamilton's vision for the school, Atkinson worked hard to continue the rapid expansion of the campus. The iconic, barrel vaulted Gymnasium Building (now Romney Gym) was built in 1922, replacing a dilapidated "drill hall" and giving the school's men's basketball team its first home court. The Heating Plant, Lewis Hall, and Roberts Hall followed in 1923. By the 1920s, the school was commonly referred to as Montana State College (MSC). Herrick Hall followed in 1926. The college was justifiably proud of its academic accomplishments, but its sports teams entered a golden age as well. In 1922, Atkinson hired George Ott Romney and Schubert Dyche as co-head coaches of the football and men's basketball teams. Between 1922 and 1928 (the year he departed Montana for Brigham Young University), Romney's football teams compiled a 28–20–1 record. This included the 1924 season in which his team went undefeated until the final game of the year. As co-head basketball coach, Romney's teams compiled a 144–31 record and invented the fast break. After Romney left, Schubert Dyche coached the "Golden Bobcats" team of 1928, which had a 36–2 record and won the national championship. In his seven years as basketball coach, Dyche's teams compiled a 110–93 record (this included the dismal 1932–33 and 1933–34 seasons), but won their conference championship twice. In 1930, the college built Gatton Field, a football field on what is now the site of the Marga Hosaeus Fitness Center. In one of President Atkinson's last accomplishments, the Dormitory Quadrangle (now Atkinson Quadrangle) was built.

The first three decades of the 20th century were rowdy ones on the college campus. Bozeman had a large red-light district by 1900, alcohol was plentiful and cheap, and there was little in the way of organized entertainment such as theaters to occupy the student body. President Reid spent much of his presidency cracking down on dancing, drinking, gambling, and prostitution by students. President Hamilton sought to improve the atmosphere for women by building Hamilton Hall, which was not only the first on-campus housing for students but also the first all-women's housing on campus. Access by men to Hamilton Hall was strictly limited to young teenage boys (who acted as servants); adult males were permitted only in the first floor lounge, and only on Sundays. Atkinson Quadrangle was built on the location of the College Inn, also known as the "Bobcat Lair," a popular student drinking and dancing hangout.

Depression and World War II

The college suffered greatly during the Great Depression. The price of agricultural products (Montana's economic mainstay) soared during World War I, as European and Russian farms were devastated by military campaigns, in which American and European armies demanded food. For a few years after the war, these prices remained high. But as European agriculture began to improve, an agricultural depression swamped the United States beginning about 1923. State tax revenues plunged, and fewer buildings were constructed on campus after 1923. The United States entered the Great Depression in 1929. President Franklin D. Roosevelt established the Public Works Administration (PWA) in 1933 to provide federal funding for public works construction as a means of economic stimulus. But President Atkinson was strongly opposed to Roosevelt's New Deal, and refused to accept PWA funds to expand the college. With the state unable to assist, Montana State College stagnated through the 1930s.

President Atkinson resigned in 1937 to become president of the University of Arizona. A. L. Strand, an entomologist who had discovered ways of controlling the devastating locust invasions in Montana, was named the new president. Strand was the first graduate of the college to become its president. An upsurge in campus drinking occurred after the end of Prohibition, and in 1940 the Student Union Building (now Strand Union Building) was built to provide students with a gathering spot on campus that (it was hoped) would keep them away from the saloons downtown.

President Strand resigned his office in 1942 to accept the presidency of Oregon State University (in which role he served for 19 years). With Montana still not yet having emerged from the Great Depression, the college struggled to find a new president. Engineering professor William Cobleigh took over as Acting President until from 1942 to 1943 while a replacement for Strand was found. During Cobleigh's year as president, college enrollment plunged as young men entered the armed forces or left to work in war industry plants on the West Coast. Nonetheless, federal funding increased as the United States Department of War sought rapid, significant increases in the number of chemical, engineering, and physics graduates to feed the war effort.

The Renne years

In 1943, the state board of higher education appointed MSC economist Roland "Rollie" Renne to be the new acting president of the college. Renne was a protege of nationally known liberal economists Richard T. Ely and John R. Commons and a strong proponent of the New Deal. He'd taught at MSC since 1930, although he'd taken a leave of absence in 1942 to become the director of Montana's Office of Price Administration and Civilian Supply (a federal wartime agency). Renne was named the permanent president of the college on 1 July 1944.

Renne was president of the college for 21 years, the third-longest of any individual (as of 2013). With the passage of the G.I. Bill just eight days before his appointment and the end of the war in sight, Renne realized that servicemen returning from the war were going to flood college campuses. Renne quickly began hiring additional faculty and recycled wartime wooden buildings from around the state to build temporary classroom and housing space. His foresight helped the college survive the rapid rise in enrollment, which doubled from 1,155 in 1945 to 2,014 in 1946 and then nearly doubled again in 1947 to 3,591. Faculty numbers also skyrocketed, from 132 in 1945 to 257 in 1950. Believing that a college education was as much about instilling democratic values as teaching skills and trades, Renne rapidly changed the curriculum to emphasize liberal arts such as anthropology, archeology, history, political science, psychology, and sociology. Although the University of Montana (long considered the state's "liberal arts college", while MSC was the "ag school") opposed much expansion in this area, Renne successfully established a Department of Education, reconstituted the School of Business, and established new undergraduate and graduate programs in architecture, geography, geology, military science, and other disciplines.

Throughout the 1950s, Renne worked to rapidly expand the college's physical plant. During his presidency, 18 major buildings were constructed on campus — more than double the number that had been built between 1893 and 1944, and almost as many as were built between 1966 and 2013. These included the 1949 Library Building (now Renne Library), the campus' first dedicated library (it had previously been housed in a few rooms on the second floor of Montana Hall), and the 1958 Brick Breeden Fieldhouse (which supplemented the aging, outdated Romney Gym). The construction program included a chapel (Danforth Chapel in 1950), five large classroom buildings (McCall Hall in 1952, A.J.M. Johnson Hall in 1954, Reid Hall in 1959, Cooley Laboratory in 1960, and Gaines Hall in 1961), and seven residential and dining halls (Hannon Hall in 1954; Johnstone Hall in 1955; Culbertson Hall, Harrison Dining Hall, Mullan Hall, and Langford Hall in 1955; and Hapner Hall in 1959). Begun under his presidency but completed the year after he left were three more residential and dining halls (North Hedges, South Hedges, and Miller Dining Hall).

There was some criticism that Renne did not pay full attention to the college in the 1950s. His governance style was somewhat authoritarian, and his extended absences led to leadership vacuums. He agreed to consulting roles with the Water Resources Policy Commission, Mutual Security Agency, the Food and Agriculture Organization of the United Nations, the United States Department of State, and the United States Department of Health, Education and Welfare throughout the 1950s that often took him away from campus for weeks at a time. He took a leave of absence from the college to become Assistant Secretary of Agriculture for International Affairs from 1963 to 1964.

Dr. Renne resigned as president of Montana State College effective 1 January 1964, to run for Governor of Montana. He lost the election, 51.4 to 48.6 percent, to incumbent governor Tim Babcock.

Campus life was not without its controversy during Renne's tenure, either. With McCarthyism and anti-communist feeling running high in the country, Renne sought to protect the campus from political investigations by restricting student speech and assembly. He also restricted the kind of speakers who visited the campus, most famously denying former First Lady Eleanor Roosevelt and literary critic Leslie Fiedler the right to speak on campus. Other incidents also brought notoriety to campus. On 7 March 1957, 1,000 male students engaged in a "panty raid" on Hannon Hall. It turned into a riot that took all night to control.

University status and campus conservatism

In February 1964, Dr. Leon H. Johnson was appointed president of MSC. A research chemist who joined the college in 1943, he had most recently been the executive director of school's Endowed and Research Foundation (at the time, MSC's largest research unit) and Dean of the Graduate Division. Deeply committed to the college's research function, he pushed for MSC to be named a university — a change Renne had since the early 1950s, and which the Montana state legislature approved on 1 July 1965. At that time, the school received its new name, Montana State University (MSU). Bachelor's degree programs in economics, English, history, music, political science, and other disciplines were quickly established, as was the first university honors program. Johnson was a devoted admirer of the arts, and MSU's art and music programs blossomed. Johnson quickly worked to end the acrimonious relationship with the University of Montana, and the two schools began to present a united front to the state legislature.

In 1966, Johnson altered and enlarged the university's administrative structure to help cope with increasing enrollment and increasing campus complexity. These changes included creating a 12-member executive council to advise him. The council included newly created vice presidents — overseeing areas such as academic affairs, administration, finance and research.

Johnson was deeply conservative — fiscally, socially, and politically. He was deeply committed to continuing Renne's educational plan, but declined to spend money on new buildings (preferring to consolidate and renovate rather than expand). He also continued Renne's policies largely barring from campus speakers who were not clearly in the political mainstream. Johnson's policies were largely supported by the student body and the taxpaying public. MSU practiced a policy known as in loco parentis, in which it acted as a "parent" toward the "children" attending school there. Students themselves accepted these restrictions, which included dress codes, older adult chaperones at dances, a ban on alcohol, and mandatory military training for freshmen and sophomores. Although many American college campuses were engulfed by student radicalism, MSU's student body was as conservative as Johnson was, however, and for many years the biggest issues on campus were ending Saturday morning classes and building student parking lots.

There were some campus protests, however. The first protest against the Vietnam War occurred in 1966 (drawing about 100 students), two underground student newspapers briefly appeared, and some students organized clubs to debate issues of the day. There were minor faculty and student protests when Johnson attempted to prevent English professor James Myers from assigning students to read James Baldwin's novel Another Country, and in the summer of 1968 a few faculty organized a symposium on the war. When about 150 students rallied in front of Montana Hall in 1969 to ask for co-ed and "open visitation" dorms (e.g., to allow men into women's dorm rooms, and vice versa), Johnson threatened to call out the city police.

MSU's Bobcat Stadium saw its genesis during the Johnson years. Growing student unrest over the football team's use of decrepit Gatton Field (while the basketball team used modern Brick Breeden Fieldhouse) led to a proposal by Johnson in April 1968 to build a 16,000-seat stadium funded by student fees. The proposal failed in December 1968 after students argued that the university should concurrently build a new fitness center as well.

President Johnson died of a heart attack on 18 June 1969. He'd suffered a heart attack in October 1968, and then underwent surgery out of state in April 1969.

William Johnstone, a professor of education and Vice President for Administration at MSU, took over as Acting President. He was the first and (as of 2013) the only Montanan to become president of MSU. Johnstone pledged to build the fitness center first, and in December 1969 the student body approved the finance plan for the new football stadium. On 2 April 1970, about 250 students engaged in a sit-in in Montana Hall to protest Myers' termination, but it ended peacefully a day later. Myers was terminated, and another eight faculty resigned in protest. But during his year in office, the university completed Cobleigh Hall (ironically named for the last individual to be named acting president).

Tough fiscal times of the 1970s

Dr. Carl W. McIntosh was named MSU's eighth president in June 1970. Previously the president of 28,000-student California State University, Long Beach, McIntosh brought a consultative and deliberate style of decision-making to the university. He faced a poor fiscal climate: The state was entering a decade-long depression brought about by a steep drop in commodity prices, the state's higher education system had grown too large and unwieldy, and Governor Thomas L. Judge had established a blue-ribbon committee to close several of the state's colleges. In 1974, women faculty at MSU sued, alleging gender discrimination. They won their suit in 1976, leading to a $400,000 damages award, a back-pay award, and extensive promotions (which also increased salaries). To accommodate these fiscal realities, McIntosh ordered several doctoral and master's degree programs terminated, and all advanced degree programs in the social sciences and liberal arts canceled.

But McIntosh also scored a number of successes. In 1972, he persuaded the legislature to allow MSU to participate in the Washington, Wyoming, Alaska, Montana, and Idaho (WWAMI) medical education program, which allowed 20 (now 30) Montana citizens per year to begin medical school at MSU before completing studies at the University of Washington. The college of nursing (Sherrick Hall) was finished in 1973, and after three long years of construction Reno H. Sales Stadium (now Bobcat Stadium and Martel Field) and the Marga Hosaeus Fitness Center both opened. In 1974, the long-planned Creative Arts Complex (Cheever Hall, Haynes Hall, and Howard Hall) was also completed. Unfortunately, major increases in inflation led to significant design changes. Instead of a 1,200-seat concert hall with superb acoustics, a cramped and aurally dead 260-seat auditorium was built. Finally, in 1976, the university completed the new medical science building, Leon Johnson Hall.

In 1976, the "hidden million" controversy ended McIntosh's tenure as president. In 1975, Montana's first Commissioner of Higher Education, Dr. Lawrence K. Pettit (a former MSU professor of political science) launched an investigation of several Montana colleges and universities. He was particularly interested in MSU, where McIntosh's laid-back governance style was widely considered to have hurt the university. In March 1976, Pettit announced he was confiscating $1 million in surplus student fees from MSU — money he argued the university was trying to hide from state auditors and the legislature. In fact, the monies were the result of excessively high enrollment in the 1974–1975 school year, and were intended to help see the university through the 1975–1976 school year (when the legislature would not meet, and thus could not provide the needed budgetary boost to handle the over-enrollment). Pettit all but accused MSU and McIntosh of fraud, and McIntosh refused to attack Pettit's statements as mischaracterizations and slander. The public outcry about the "hidden million" led the Board of Regents to request McIntosh's resignation on 30 June 1977, which he tendered. (Pettit resigned the following year, his combative attempt to turn the commissioner's office into a sort of chancellorship having failed.)

Resurgence and retrenchment under Tietz
Dr. William Tietz, MSU's ninth president, arrived in August 1977 just as economic conditions in the state were improving. With three of the four vice presidencies at the university open, Tietz imposed his stamp on the administration almost immediately. This included a strong emphasis on research, faculty development, better teaching, and diversity (particularly for Native Americans, the handicapped, and women). His aggressiveness, energy, and immediate rebudgeting of funds into faculty sabbaticals helped win over professors, who voted against unionization in 1978. Tietz's major goal, increasing research funding, was greatly helped by a 1981 decision of the legislature to refund indirect cost payments back to the university. This led to an immediate 15 percent recovery of in federal funds, and in time private foundation funding rose significantly as well.

Only two buildings were constructed during Tietz's presidency — the Visual Communications Building in 1983 and the Plant Growth Center in 1987. Most of his focus as president was on raising salaries. A third building, the modern home of the Museum of the Rockies, opened in 1989. But this structure was paid for by bonds. Faculty salaries had declined 23 percent during the 1970s (due to wage freezes) and MSU was in the bottom 10 percent of salaries for faculty nationwide. Cooperative Extension Service salaries were dead last in the nation. The state legislature implemented a new salary funding formula that rectified many of these problems. Some university programs were also reestablished, such as the honors program, and some new ones formed, such as the Writing Center.

The state once more entered a severe economic downturn in the mid-1980s. Budget cuts totaling nearly 10 percent, coupled with an enrollment shortfall, led to significant retrenchment. Tietz argued MSU should focus on its strongest programs. Thus, a wide array of programs were terminated: Membership in the Center for Research Libraries; sports like skiing, women's gymnastics, and wrestling; degree programs like engineering science, business education, and industrial arts; and the office of institutional research. Departments were merged and downsized, and Tietz proposed closing the School of Architecture. A battle broke out to save it, and Tietz backed off his decision. Tietz increasingly blamed Governor Ted Schwinden for a failure to support higher education, and lashed out repeatedly against the governor when Schwinden publicly ridiculed MSU's new Tech Park (a  project designed to function as a technology incubator). Although a second faculty unionization effort failed in 1989, Tietz resigned in March 1990, frustrated by the constant battles with an "old guard" resistant to turning MSU toward high technology.

Centennial and expansion

Michael P. Malone was named MSU's Acting President on 1 January 1991, and permanently appointed to the position in March 1991, Malone was named MSU's 10th president. He had served as MSU's Dean of Graduate Studies from 1979 to 1988, and then three one-year temporary appointments as vice president for Academic Affairs while a fruitless nation search occurred for a permanent replacement. As Dean of Graduate Studies, he'd been critical of what he perceived as the state's unwillingness to invest in high technology education.

Malone's governance style was democratic, friendly, and personal. His friendly style made him personally popular with legislators and earned their respect. Nonetheless, he was criticized for focusing too much about how little money MSU had and for criticizing the legislature too much for not investing in higher education.

Malone was the first MSU president to preside over the Billings, Great Falls, and Havre campuses. On 1 July 1994, Montana restructured the Montana University System. Eastern Montana College in Billings, Montana Northern College in Havre, and the Vocational-Technical Center in Great Falls lost their independence and were made satellite campuses of Montana State University. Although Montana's seven tribal colleges remained independent (as they are sponsored by sovereign nations), the state required them to integrate their teaching, operations, and academic operations with both Montana State University and the University of Montana in order to continue to receive state funding.

Montana State University celebrated its centennial in 1993. A university history called In the People's Interest: A Centennial History of Montana State University was published to celebrate the centennial, authored by three Montana State history professors--Jeffrey J. Safford, Pierce Mullen, and Robert Rydell. 

During Malone's presidency, Montana State University witnessed "one of the greatest expansions in campus history", as a large number of new buildings were constructed. These included the $1 million Centennial Mall (1993), the $22 million Engineering and Physical Sciences Building (1997), the $10 million Bobcat Stadium renovation, the $13.5 million renovation of Brick Breeden Fieldhouse, the $12 million Agricultural Biosciences Building (1999), and the $7.5 million Renne Library renovation (1999). A strong sports fan, Malone's focus extended to sports personnel as well as sports facilities. In 1999, he fired Bobcats football head coach Cliff Hysell after eight losing seasons and hired Mike Kramer, the winning coach at Eastern Washington University. In October 1999, he fired MSU women's basketball head coach Tracey Sheehan and assistant coach Jeff Malby after an NCAA investigation revealed that the two coaches were overworking their team and causing injuries to student-athletes.

Like William Tietz before him, Malone also pushed hard for faculty and the university to seek and win federal funding for scientific research. Federal research funding grew from just $13 million in the late 1980s to more than $50 million in 1999. The undergraduate curriculum was revamped, enrollment hit a historic high of 11,746 students in 1999, and the Burns Telecommunications Center was established. Malone benefitted from a strong economy that eased many of the fiscal pressures Tietz faced. He expanded alumni fund-raising programs, and pushed the MSU Foundation to redouble its fund-raising efforts. But the legislature was not forthcoming with salary increases. He weathered a strike by clerical and administrative support staff in 1992. He was later criticized, however, for initiating projects without having the money to complete them and then using the subsequent construction crisis to raise the funds to finish the project. Tuition doubled during his time in office, angering students, and some faculty criticized his willingness to construct new buildings while declining to pay for teaching equipment.

The MSU community was shocked when Malone died of a heart attack on 21 December 1999, at Bozeman Yellowstone International Airport. He was the second MSU president to die in office, and the second to die of heart failure.

Twenty-first century stability

Malone's successor, Geoffrey Gamble, was named the 11th president of Montana State University on 5 October 2000. His governance style was open and consultative. In addition to making the president's executive council more representative and reaching out to the Faculty Senate, he established a new 25-member University Planning, Budget and Analysis Committee to establish the university budget. Legislatively, Gamble promoted MSU's accomplishments, praised legislators for their financial support (even when it was not forthcoming), and spoke of state funding for the university in terms of investment that led to economic and job growth. According to Cathy Conover, MSU's chief legislative lobbyist, Gamble's style was "a sea change" that led the Republican-dominated state legislature to rave about him.

Montana State University also implemented the "Core 2.0 curriculum" during Gamble's tenure as president. This program encourages undergraduate students to engage in research or practice their art prior to graduation.

Gamble also focused on research. Between 2000 and 2009, federal research funding at MSU grew by 61 percent to $98.4 million. Gamble trademarked the name "University of the Yellowstone" to reflect the high level of research MSU conducted in the greater Yellowstone National Park ecosystem.

Gamble also made diversity a major effort of his presidency. He appointed the university's first permanent female vice president, and by 2009 women outnumbered men among MSU's deans, five to four. He appointed Dr. Henrietta Mann (chair of the MSU Department of Native American Studies, and one of the most prominent Indian educators in the United States) his personal representative to the seven tribal colleges which participate in the Montana University System and created a Council of Elders to bring leaders of the tribal colleges together twice a year at MSU for discussions. Native American enrollment at MSU rose 79 percent (to a historic high of 377 students) during Gamble's time in office.

In 2006, a major sports scandal engulfed Montana State University. On 30 June 2006, former MSU basketball player Branden Miller and former MSU football player John LeBrum were charged with murdering local cocaine dealer Jason Wright. After an 18-month investigation, six additional current and former MSU athletes were charged with buying and selling cocaine. Three of the six were charged with running a cocaine smuggling ring that sold  of cocaine in Bozeman between June 2005 to May 2007.

Court records later revealed that some MSU coaches knew Miller carried handguns in his athletic bag at school and that the murder weapon and other handguns had been secreted in Brick Breeden Fieldhouse. In August 2007, Sports Illustrated ran a front-page article, "Trouble in Paradise", that recounted drug use, violence, theft, intimidation, and illegal activities by current and former MSU student athletes and the complicity of low-level coaching staff. An investigation by the NCAA revealed significantly lower graduation rates for MSU football and basketball players under football coach Mike Kramer as well as men's basketball coach Mick Durham, and a large number of athletes on or flirting with academic probation. Gamble quickly fired Kramer, who then sued MSU for unlawful dismissal. Kramer and MSU settled out of court, and Kramer received a payment of $240,000. In 2009, Gamble said his hardest time as president was dealing with the sports scandal.

Gamble announced his retirement on 22 March 2009.

Record growth
Waded Cruzado, the former president of New Mexico State University, succeeded Gamble as president, taking office on 4 January 2010. Since her arrival, the university's headcount enrollment has grown from 13,559 in the fall of 2010 to a record 16,902 in the fall of 2018 – a 24.66 percent increase – making MSU the largest university in the state of Montana.

In addition to enrollment increases, the campus has seen the completion of numerous major construction and renovation projects since Cruzado's arrival. In the fall of 2010, the university reopened one of its most heavily used classroom buildings on campus, Gaines Hall, after a $32 million renovation funded by the Montana Legislature.

That same fall, the university opened its new, 40,000-square-foot Animal Bioscience Building. The $15.7 million building was funded, in part, by donations from Montana's livestock and grains industry. In addition to classroom and teaching laboratory space, the building is home to the MSU College of Agriculture's Department of Animal and Range Sciences.

While the Gaines Hall renovation and the Animal Biosciences building were underway before Cruzado took office, in the fall of 2010 she launched an ambitious 90-day campaign to raise $6 million in private donations for a $10 million project to replace and expand the 38-year-old south end zone of the university's football stadium. The university would cover the remaining $4 million for the project, paying it back from revenues generated by MSU Athletics, including ticket sales. The campaign was successful and resulted in a new end zone opening for the fall 2011 season. The end zone project resulted in a net gain of 5,200 seats for the stadium for a total capacity of 17,500. However, through additional standing-room-only attendance, the stadium thrice exceeded 21,000 spectators in the fall of 2013.

The fall of 2010 also marked the official opening of Gallatin College Programs at MSU, offering two-year degrees. The program was previously known as MSU-Great Falls College of Technology in Bozeman and was located away from the central campus, but with the renaming, Gallatin College was also given offices and classrooms in Hamilton Hall, located in the campus center. The program's first dean, Bob Hietala, oversaw a period of steady enrollment growth, with Gallatin College growing from 100 students at its start to more than 800 in fall 2019. The program also expanded into new spaces, leasing empty classrooms in the local high school and space in a commercial building off-campus.

MSU marked its 125th anniversary in 2018 with a year of celebratory events. Several thousand attended daylong events on 16–17 Feb. featuring family activities, music, fireworks and speeches commemorating the university's history. A newly installed statue of Abraham Lincoln by Bozeman-area artist Jim Dolan was unveiled at a ceremony honoring the former president's contributions to land-grant universities.

In November 2019, the Board of Regents voted to raise Cruzado's salary by $150,000, citing her performance as president and amid reports Cruzado had received a larger offer from another university. Cruzado declined to name the university that wanted to hire her. The 50% raise received support for putting Cruzado's salary in-line with other universities' presidents' salaries but also criticism given Montana's median salary ($53,000) and the pay of lower-level employees. In 2020, Cruzado's salary stood at $476,524 per year.

Severe snow and cold during the winter of 2019 contributed to the collapses of two gymnasium roofs at the university's Marga Hosaeus Fitness Center. The center's south gym roof fell during the early morning hours of 7 March, followed two days later by the north gym roof. No one was injured in the collapses, and the entire fitness center is in the process of being rebuilt. Two inflatable gym structures, known as North and South Dome, exist as temporary replacements until the new Marga Hosaeus Fitness Center is completed.

The COVID-19 pandemic in the spring of 2020 forced Montana's public university system to switch to online and remote course delivery midway through the spring semester. To help stem the spread of the disease, the university canceled events, encouraged students not to return after spring break, and asked employees to work from home, essentially emptying the campus. The in-person spring commencement ceremony was also replaced by an online alternative.

Presidents
(Acting president) Luther Foster - 16 February 1893, to 17 April 1893
1. Augustus M. Ryon - 17 April 1893, to 1895
2. James R. Reid - 1895 to 1904
3. James M. Hamilton - 1904 to 1919
4. Alfred Atkinson - 1920 to 1937
5. A. L. Strand - 1937 to 1942
(Acting president) William Cobleigh - 1942 to 1943
6. Roland Renne - 1943 to 1964 (acting from 1943 to 30 June 1944)
7. Leon H. Johnson - February 1964 to 1969 (died in office)
(Acting president) William Johnstone - 1969-1970
8. Carl W. McIntosh - 1970 to 1977
9. William Tietz - August 1977 to December 1990
10. Michael P. Malone - March 1991 to 21 December 1999 (died in office)
(Interim president) Terry Roark - 21 January 2000 to 30 November 2000
11. Geoffrey Gamble - 1 December 2000, to 22 December 2009
12. Waded Cruzado - 1 January 2010, to present (as of January 2022)

Academics

MSU offers baccalaureate degrees in 60 fields, master's degrees in 68 fields, and doctoral degrees in 35 fields through its nine colleges.

MSU is the national leader for Phi Kappa Phi Graduate Fellowships and is among the top ten institutions in the country for recipients of Goldwater Scholarships, having produced 74 of the scholars as of May 2019. The university counts among its graduates several recipients of the Rhodes and Truman scholarships, and MSU has consistently produced winners of USA Today Academic All-America honors. Montana State University offers the world's only Master of Fine Arts degree in Science and Natural History Filmmaking, and MSU's Museum of the Rockies is home to the largest T. Rex skull ever found—bigger, even, than "Sue" at the Chicago Field Museum.

Montana State University refers to itself as "the University of the Yellowstone," for its extensive research and scholarly activities concerning the Greater Yellowstone Ecosystem. Montana State University has received more than five times the number of National Science Foundation grants for Yellowstone studies than its nearest competition, Stanford and UCLA, according to David Roberts, head of MSU's ecology department.

Academic programs, procedures and policies are overseen by the Office of the Executive Vice President for Academic Affairs and Provost. This office handles all teaching-related issues and is responsible for faculty hiring, establishing academic programs and curricula, course scheduling and accreditation. The position has been held since April 2017 by Robert Mokwa. He succeeded Martha Potvin, who in 2010 became the university's first female provost.

Colleges
 
 College of Agriculture
 College of Arts and Architecture
 Jake Jabs College of Business and Entrepreneurship
 College of Education, Health & Human Development
 Norm Asbjornson College of Engineering
 College of Letters & Science
 College of Nursing
 Graduate School
 Gallatin College
 Honors College
 Roland R. Renne Library

Research
Montana State University maintains extensive research programs, providing opportunities for undergraduates, graduates, and advanced graduate students. The university is in the top 3 percent of colleges and universities in the United States in research expenditures and regularly reports annual research expenditures in excess of $100 million, including a record $138.8 million in the fiscal year that ended in June 2019. In that same year the university said its faculty wrote 1,100 grant proposals, which led to grant awards worth about $485 million which will be spent over several years.

MSU's Office of Research and Economic Development coordinates programs that encourage faculty to pursue externally funded research. Its Office of Research Compliance oversees programs that promotes ethical and responsible research and ensures compliance with local, state, and federal regulations for research. The Office of Sponsored programs manages financial, reporting, compliance, auditing and related tasks for externally funded research.

The university maintains a technology transfer office to commercialize MSU faculty inventions, spur businesses based on those technologies and network with businesses looking to license MSU technologies. The office manages more than 500 technologies and 375 patents, trademarks and copyrights.

The Renne Library--or the Montana State University Library--contains, (in addition to supporting the research and information needs of Montana State faculty, students and the Montana Extension Service) a department dedicated to manuscript materials, photographs, and other historical ephemera called the Merrill G. Burlingame Archives and Special Collections, or the Montana State University Archives and Special Collections.

Research and Education Centers, Institutes, and Programs 
Montana's State's Office of Research and Economic Development maintains a listing of the university's research and educational centers, institutes and programs.

 
 Agricultural Marketing Policy Center
 American Indian/Alaska Native Clinical & Translational Research Program (AIANCTRP)
 American Indian Research Opportunities (AIRO)
 Animal Resource Center
 Applied Research Laboratory 
 Astrobiology Biogeocatalysis Research Center
 Barley and Plant Biotechnology Programs
 Big Sky Carbon Sequestration Partnership
 Blackstone LaunchPad - Montana State
 Burns Technology Center
 Center for American Indian and Rural Health Equity (CAIRHE)
 Center for Biofilm Engineering
 Center for Mental Health Research and Recovery
 Center for Research on Rural Education
 Center for Science, Technology, Ethics and Society
 Central Agricultural Research Center
 Cold Regions Research Center
 Computer Science Research 
 Eastern Agricultural Research Center (EARC)
 Energy Research Institute (ERI)
 Experimental Program to Stimulate Competitive Research (EPSCoR)
 Food and Health Lab
 Functional Genomics Core Facility
 Image and Chemical Analysis Laboratory (ICAL)
 Initiative for Regulation and Applied Economic Research
 Ivan Doig Center for the Study of the Lands and Peoples of the North American West
 Landscape Biodiversity Lab
 Local Government Center
 Local Technical Assistance Program (LTAP)
 Magnetic Resonance Laboratory
 Mark and Robyn Jones College of Research
 Mechanical and Industrial Engineering Department
 Montana and Northern Plains Troops-to-Teachers
 Montana Area Health Education Center
 Montana Cooperative Fishery Research Unit
 Montana Engineering Education Research Center (MEERC)
 Montana IDeA Network for Biomedical Research Opportunities (INBRE)
 Montana Institute on Ecosystems
 Montana Manufacturing Extension Center
 Montana Microfabrication Facility
 Montana Office of Rural Health (MORH)
 Montana Public Television - KUSM
 Montana Space Grant Consortium
 Montana State Mass Spectrometry Facility
 Montana Water Center
 Museum of the Rockies
 Neuromuscular Biomechanics Laboratory 
 Northern Agricultural Research Center 
 Northern Plains Transition to Teaching
 Northern Rocky Mountain Science Center
 Northwestern Agricultural Center
 Optical Technology Center
 Partnership for International Research and Education (PIRE)
 Physics Engineering Design Lab 
 Plant Growth Center
 Pollinator Health Center 
 Priscu Research Group
 Renne Library
 Research Council
 Science Math Resource Center
 Sleep Research Lab
 Spatial Sciences Center
 Spectrum Lab
 Southern Agricultural Group
 Subzero Research Lab
 TechLink Center
 Thermal Biology Institute
 Western Agricultural Research Center
 Western Triangle Agricultural Research Center
 Western Transportation Institute
 Zero Emissions Research and Technology (ZERT)

Gallatin College
Gallatin College is a two-year college for degree-seeking students and is housed on MSU campus to provide access to MSU campus student services including: dormitories, library facilities, and health services. As of May 2018, Gallatin College offers six Associate of Applied Science degrees, five Certificates of Applied Science, a Professional Certificate in business management, Associate of Arts and Associate of Science transfer degrees, and a Developmental Education Program. It also offers a Dual Enrollment program for local high school students to broaden their available range of coursework offerings and share educational resources between MSU and local high schools.

Campus 
MSU houses approximately 4,200 students in its residence halls, approximately 70 percent of them freshmen. The university also offers housing to families and to graduate students

Athletics

The MSU athletic teams are nicknamed the Bobcats, and they participate in NCAA Division I (I-FCS for football) in the Big Sky Conference, of which Montana State University is a charter member. They field 13 varsity sports. Originally playing as the "Aggies," men's teams compete in football, basketball, track, cross-country, skiing, rodeo and tennis. Women's teams include volleyball, basketball, track, cross-country, tennis, golf, rodeo and skiing.

Montana State University has won several national championships in men's rodeo, three national championships in football and one national championship in men's basketball. Non-varsity (club) sports include rugby, men's hockey, men's lacrosse, baseball, fencing and ultimate frisbee. Montana State University has an ongoing rivalry with the University of Montana, most notably the cross-state football matchup, known as the "Brawl of the Wild", but also includes the cross-state club lacrosse matchup, known as the "Copper Cup".

Basketball

The school's basketball teams achieved fame throughout the 1920s by playing "racehorse basketball" and becoming one of the first schools in the nation to employ what is known as the fast break. Montana State College coach Ott Romney, who graduated with a Masters from MSC prior to World War I, pioneered the style of play, and by 1926 had assembled a team suited to playing an up-tempo brand of ball. Cat Thompson, John "Brick" Breeden, Frank Ward, Val Glynn and Max Worthington were at the heart of the MSC team that won the Rocky Mountain Conference title three straight seasons, and bested Utah State, BYU, Colorado, and University of Denver. The 1928–29 team defeated the AAU Champion Cook's Painters in a two-of-three series, winning the Rocky Mountain Conference title. The team was named National Champions by the Helms Foundation, which also named Cat Thompson one of the five greatest players in the first half of the 20th century in college hoops.

Football

In 1956 the Bobcats football team took a share of the NAIA championship in the Aluminum Bowl in Little Rock, Arkansas playing to a 0–0 tie with the Pumas of St. Joseph's College from Rensselaer, Indiana. In 1976 the Bobcats of Montana State won a national football title in NCAA Division II at Wichita Falls, Texas beating the Zips of Akron, Ohio 24–13 in the title game. In 1984, the Bobcats returned to a national football title game played in Charleston, South Carolina, beating the Bulldogs of Louisiana Tech 19-6 for their third national football title. The MSU Bobcats football is the only college team with national titles in three different classifications. The team has won 20 conference titles and has made the NCAA FCS playoffs in 2010, 2011, 2012, 2014, 2018, 2019 and 2021.

Rodeo
For almost 30 years MSU hosted the College National Finals Rodeo. Bobcat Rodeo teams have won 8 national team titles, 32 individual national championships and multiple Big Sky Regional crowns. The Bobcats Rodeo team operates under the MSU Department of Student Affairs and is supported by the C.A.T. Rodeo Scholarship Association.

Skiing
Montana State Bobcats Alpine and Nordic Ski team compete in the Rocky Mountain Intercollegiate Skiing Association and the NCAA Western Region and has produced 13 national champions. The Bobcat Nordic and Alpine ski program venues at Bridger Bowl and Bohart Ranch have hosted six NCAA National Championships.

Notable people

Alumni

 Ken Amato, (1998) NFL longsnapper
 Rudy Autio, Ceramic Artist
 Tony Boddie, USFL and NFL running back
 John W. Bonner, 13th Governor of Montana
 Marianne Cargill Liebmann, heir and major shareholder of Cargill.
 Erin Cech, sociologist and academic
 Kevin Michael Connolly, (2008) Author, Photographer, and Filmmaker
 Doug Coombs, (1985) Winner of the World Extreme Skiing Championship, in 1991 and 1993
 John Dahl, (1980) Director and screenwriter
 Steve Daines, United States Senator from Montana
 Lance Deal, (1984) 1996 Olympic silver medalist for the hammer throw
 Dennis Erickson, (1970) Professional football NFL head coach and collegiate head coach
 Zales Ecton, (1919) Montana Senator served 1947–1951
 Charles E. Erdmann, (1972) Circuit Judge of the United States Court of Appeals for the Armed Forces
 Dane Fletcher, NFL linebacker
 Jack Gillespie (born 1 October 1947) played for the New York Nets of the American Basketball Association during the 1969–70 season.
 Patricia Peck Gossel, medical historian and curator
 Jennifer Graylock, photographer
 Maurice Ralph Hilleman (1966), Microbiologist and Vaccinologist
Lester Hogan (1942), American physicist and a pioneer in microwave and semiconductor technology
 Carol Judge (Nursing 1962, M.S. 1983), First Lady of Montana (1973–1980) and healthcare advocate
 Craig Kilborn, (1987) TV host, Sportscaster, Actor
 David S. Lee, (1960) and Honorary PhD (1993) Regent of the University of California, chairman of the board, eOn Communications Corporation
 Peter Liversidge, (1994) artist
 John Lovick, (1985) magician
 Travis Lulay, (2006) CFL quarterback
 Sam McCullum, (1974) NFL wide receiver
 Allan J. McDonald, (1959) aerospace consultant and author
 R. C. McDonough, Justice of the Montana Supreme Court
 Mike McLeod, (1979) NFL safety
 Wally McRae, (1958) Rancher, Cowboy Poet, Activist
 Jill Mikucki, (2005) microbiologist, Antarctic researcher
 Joseph P. Monaghan, (1954) United States Representative from Montana
 Duane Nellis, (1976) president of Texas Tech University, former president of the University of Idaho
 Frosty Peters, American football player
 Wendy Red Star (2004) Photographer, sculptor, performance artist; humanizes misconceptions of indigenous peoples with wit, satire
 Larry Rubens, (1982) NFL center
 Reno Sales (1898), Chief Geologist of Anaconda Copper, "father of mining geology," namesake of the Reno H. Sales Stadium
 Ann Linnea Sandberg, immunologist
 Brian Schweitzer, (MS 1980) Governor of Montana
 Mary Higby Schweitzer (Ph.D. 1995), Paleontologist
 Jan Stenerud (1966) NFL kicker
 Kari Swenson, Veterinarian and 1984 Olympic Women's Biathlon 3 x 5 km relay Bronze Medalist.
 Cristina Takacs-Vesbach (1999), Antarctic researcher, microbial ecologist
 Joe Tiller (1964), Most successful head football coach in Purdue University history. Was an early pioneer of the spread formation.
 Kirk Timmer, NFL linebacker
 Lawrence VanDyke, United States Circuit Judge
 Trista Vick-Majors, Antarctic researcher, biogeochemist, microbial ecologist
 Peter Voulkos, Ceramic Artist
 Sarah Vowell, (1993) Writer, Journalist, and Voice Actor
 Irving Weissman (1961) Professor of Pathology and Developmental Biology and Director of the Stanford Institute of Stem Cell Biology and Regenerative Medicine

Faculty
 Richard Brautigan, taught Creative Writing Spring, 1982
 Bob DeWeese, modern artist and professor, 1949-1977
 Peter Fonda, taught Film Workshop, Fall, 2000
 Jack Horner, former Regents Professor of Paleontology and Curator of Paleontology, Museum of the Rockies, taught Paleontology
 Patrick Markey, taught as adjunct professor.
 Christopher Parkening, Classical Guitarist (Honorary Doctorate 1983), teaches annual Master Guitar Class
 Robert Pirsig, author of Zen and the Art of Motorcycle Maintenance, taught creative writing 1959–1961.
 Bill Pullman, taught Theater and active with Montana Shakespeare in the Parks
 David Quammen, Science, Nature, and Travel Writer (Honorary Doctorate, 2000) taught and served as Wallace Stegner Professor in Western American Studies, 2006–2008.
 Frances Senska, taught Ceramics Arts, 1946–1973.
 Gary Strobel, Microbiologist and Professor Emeritus of Plant Pathology, teaches Plant Sciences

Student organizations

Student groups 
MSU's Office of Student Engagement organizes programs, events, and services for students. The office registers student clubs and organizations and currently has more than 300 listed groups.

Fraternities and sororities 
As of 2020, 7 fraternities and 5 sororities are active. The fraternities and govern themselves via a body known as the Interfraternity Council; a similar body, called the Panhellenic Council, exists for sororities. Both bodies focus on chapter development, scholarship, community service, member education, and alumni and public relations.

Fraternities 
 Sigma Alpha Epsilon
 Alpha Gamma Rho
 Alpha Sigma Phi
 Kappa Sigma
 Pi Kappa Alpha
 Sigma Phi Epsilon
 Sigma Chi
 Sigma Nu

Sororities 
 Alpha Omicron Pi
 Chi Omega
 Alpha Gamma Delta
 Pi Beta Phi
 Delta Gamma
 Sigma Alpha

Notes

References

External links 

 
 Official athletics website

 
Buildings and structures in Bozeman, Montana
Tourist attractions in Bozeman, Montana
1893 establishments in Montana